Minyanka (also known as Mamara, Miniyanka, Minya, Mianka, Minianka, or Tupiire) is a northern Senufo language spoken by about 750,000 people in southeastern Mali. It is closely related to Supyire. Minyanka is one of the national languages of Mali.

Phonology

Consonants 

 A pharyngeal fricative [ʕ] is also typically heard when in between vowels, or as an allophone of /ɡ/ when in intervocalic position.
 Glottal sounds [h, ɦ] are only heard in the Bla dialect, instead of labio-velar sounds /k͡p, ɡ͡b, ŋ͡m/.
 Sounds /k, ɡ/ can also be heard as fricatives [x, ɣ] when in intervocalic positions.

Vowels

See also
Senufo language

References

Further reading
 Dombrowsky-Hahn, Klaudia (ed. by Miehe, Gudrun; Reineke, Brigitte; Roncador, Manfred von) (1999) Phénomènes de contact entre les langues Minyanka et Bambara (Sud du Mali). Köln: Rüdiger Köppe.
 Prost, André (1964) Contributrion à l'étude des langues Voltaiques. Dakar: Institut Francophone de l'Afrique Noire.

External links
 Minyanka-French-Bambara-English Dictionary to view online or download, from the Association for the Promotion of the Mamara language, Koutiala, Mali.
 Resources in Mamara from SIL Mali
 PanAfrican L10n page on Suppire/Minianka

Suppire–Mamara languages
Languages of Mali